Kochanovce is a village and municipality in Humenné District in the Prešov Region of northeast Slovakia.

History
In historical records the village was first mentioned in 1543.

Geography
The municipality lies at an altitude of 157 metres and covers an area of 5.02 km2.
It has a population of 752 (y.2018) people.

Genealogical resources
The records for genealogical research are available at the state archive "Statny Archiv in Presov, Slovakia"

 Roman Catholic church records (births/marriages/deaths): 1802-1911 (parish B)
 Greek Catholic church records (births/marriages/deaths): 1768-1946 (parish B)

See also
 List of municipalities and towns in Slovakia

References

External links
 
 
 Surnames of living people in Kochanovce

Villages and municipalities in Humenné District